Sachindranath Sengupta (1891 - 1961), also known as Sachin Sengupta was a prominent Bengali playwright and the producer and director of theatrical plays in Calcutta, India. His works include the dramatization of the works of poets Rabindranath Tagore and Kazi Nazrul Islam. Some of his famous plays include- Raktakamal, Rashtrabirohi, Desher dabi. Sirajdullah was his most famous work. It was staged both as a Natak and Jatra all over Bengal and was very popular among the contemporary Bengali society. He had travelled Russia, China, Ceylon etc. as the part of the non governmental troupe. He died on 5 March 1961 (Bhupen Bose Avenue, Kolkata).
Son's name- Rabindranath Sengupta, Surendranath Sengupta & Dipendra Sengupta/Dipen Sengupta (family lives in now Behala, Kolkata).

References

For farther information -"তরঙ্গ উৎসব সংখ্যা২০১৩" little magazine: writer Abhirup Dasgupta, Page (23-25)(sachin Sengupta's sister Protiva moye debi is great grand mother of Abhirup Dasgupta)

1891 births
1961 deaths
Indian male dramatists and playwrights
Bengali writers
University of Calcutta alumni
20th-century Indian dramatists and playwrights
Dramatists and playwrights from West Bengal
Writers from Kolkata
20th-century Indian male writers

People from Khulna District